The Duncan House is a historic house in 610 West Central Avenue in Harrison, Arkansas.  It is a -story wood-frame structure, with asymmetrical massing and a busy roofline typical of the Queen Anne style.  Distinctive features include metal cresting on the ridge lines, and a wraparound porch with tapered columns and turned balustrade.  An octagonal cupola caps the roof.  The house was built in 1893 by William Duncan, a local builder, for his own use.  It is one of Harrison's few remaining houses of the period which has retained its Queen Anne features.

The house was listed on the National Register of Historic Places in 2005.

See also
National Register of Historic Places listings in Boone County, Arkansas

References

External links
The Queen Anne House Bed and Breakfast

Houses on the National Register of Historic Places in Arkansas
Queen Anne architecture in Arkansas
Houses completed in 1893
Houses in Boone County, Arkansas
National Register of Historic Places in Boone County, Arkansas
Buildings and structures in Harrison, Arkansas
1893 establishments in Arkansas